Solar power in Morocco is enabled by the country having one of the highest rates of solar insolation among other countries— about 3,000 hours per year of sunshine but up to 3,600 hours in the desert. Morocco has launched one of the world’s largest solar energy projects costing an estimated $9 billion. The aim of the project was to create 2,000 megawatts of solar generation capacity by 2020. The Moroccan Agency for Solar Energy (MASEN), a public-private venture, was established to lead the project.  The first plant, Ouarzazate Solar Power Station, was commissioned in 2016.

Morocco is the only African country to have a power cable link to Europe (1,400 or 2,100 MW). The cable sent 5756 GWh from Spain to Morocco in 2017, and very little the opposite way.

Ouarzazate solar plant 

The Moroccan Agency for Solar Energy invited expressions of interest in the design, construction, operation, maintenance and financing of the first of the five planned solar power stations, the 500 MW complex in the southern town of Ouarzazate, that includes both PV and CSP. 
Construction officially began on 10 May 2013. 
The project is divided in 3 phases: a 160MW concentrated solar power project, a 200MW parabolic mirror plant, and a 150MW solar trough plant.

The 160 MW first phase, Noor I, was brought online in February 2016. 
The project was awarded to a consortium led by Saudi Arabia's ACWA Power, which sells the electricity produced for $0.19/kW·h, and co-financed by the World Bank and the European Investment Bank. 
The second phase, the 200 MW Noor 2 plant, came online in January 2018, and the third phase is expected to come online by the end of 2018.
These two phases provide another 580 MW and cover 6,000 acres.

Largest solar power plants 
Morocco Renewable Energy solar projects to be installed between now and 2030

Planned

See also

Energy policy of Morocco
Renewable energy in Morocco
Wind power in Morocco
Renewable energy by country
Xlinks Morocco-UK Power Project

References

External links

Eurosunmed - Agency for European - Moroccan Cooperation on Solar Energy